Savanna Army Depot was a  installation, located on the eastern bank of the Mississippi River, in Carroll and Jo Daviess counties, around  north of Savanna, Illinois. It was opened in 1917 as a proving and testing facility for weapons developed at Rock Island Arsenal. In 1921 it became a weapons depot. The U.S. Environmental Protection Agency (EPA) listed the depot as a Superfund site in 1989. The depot was selected for closure through the Base Realignment and Closure process in July 1995 and was officially closed on March 18, 2000. The Jo-Carroll Local Redevelopment Authority (LRA) was established to redevelop a portion of the property for commercial and business usage referred to as the Savanna Depot Park. On September 26, 2003, the United States Department of Defense agreed to transfer  of land to become the Lost Mound Unit of the Upper Mississippi River National Wildlife and Fish Refuge.  were initially transferred with the rest to be transferred following environmental cleanup. The portion near Lock and Dam No. 12 was transferred to the United States Army Corps of Engineers and a small part to the Illinois Department of Natural Resources.

References

External links
[Jo-Carroll Local Redevelopment Authority (LRA)]
Lost Mound Unit of the Upper Mississippi River National Wildlife and Fish Refuge.

[Savanna Depot Park]

Buildings and structures in Carroll County, Illinois
Buildings and structures in Jo Daviess County, Illinois
United States Army arsenals
Military installations in Illinois
1917 establishments in Illinois
Military Superfund sites
United States Army arsenals during World War II
Superfund sites in Illinois
Historic American Engineering Record in Illinois
2000 disestablishments in Illinois